Capital Guardian may refer to:

Capital Guardian, a division of Capital Group Companies
Capital Guardians, nickname of units of the District of Columbia National Guard, including
113th Wing 
201st Airlift Squadron

See also
Guardian Capital Group, Canadian financial services business
Guardian (disambiguation)
Capital (disambiguation)